The Jacob van Heemskerck-class frigate was a class of frigates of the Royal Netherlands Navy. The helicopter was replaced by a Standard medium range surface-to-air missile (SAM) system and associated radars. Two ships were built for the Royal Netherlands Navy. In 2005 they were sold to the Chilean Navy.

Design
In the early 1970s, the Koninklijke Marine (Royal Netherlands Navy) developed what became known as the 'Standard' frigate, with anti-submarine and anti-aircraft versions using common hull designs and machinery and as far as practicable, common electronics and sensors. It was planned to order 12 anti-submarine variants (the ), enough to equip two task groups (each led by a  guided-missile frigate) to operate in the Atlantic, while a single anti-aircraft version would act as flagship for a third task group, consisting of the older s to operate in the English Channel and North Sea. In 1981, however, two Kortenaers were sold to Greece while building, and it was decided to build two anti-aircraft versions of the 'Standard' class (the 'L' class) as replacements, with the planned thirteenth 'Standard'-class frigate being abandoned.

A Mk 13 missile launcher for the American Standard SM-1 medium-range surface-to-air missile (SAM) (with a 40-missile magazine) replaced the helicopter hangar and deck of the Kortenaers. This was supplemented by an eight round Mk 29 NATO Sea Sparrow short range SAM launcher forward, with 24 missiles carried. A Goalkeeper close-in weapon system was mounted aft, while the forward-mounted OTO Melara 76 mm gun of the Kortenaers was omitted. Launchers for eight Harpoon anti-ship missiles were positioned amidships, while anti-submarine armament consisted of four tubes for Mark 46 torpedoes.

As built, the ships were fitted with a Signaal LW-08 long-range air search radar, a DA-05 target tracking radar. Two STIR-240 director radars provided guidance for the Standard missiles, while a STIR-180 radar directed the Sea Sparrow missiles. A PHS-36 hull sonar was also fitted. In the nineties the DA-05 radar was replaced by the new SMART tracking radar.

Ships

Two ships were built by Royal Schelde dockyard. The ships were named after Admirals (Jacob van Heemskerk and Witte Corneliszoon de With) as is usual practice in the Royal Netherlands Navy.

Gallery

See also
 List of naval ship classes in service
 Kortenaer-class frigates - The Jacob van Heemskerck-class is based on this design, with only slight modifications.

References

Citations

Sources

External links 
Jacob van Heemskerck - class Guided Missile Frigate (L-Frigate)
Jacob van Heemskerck air defence frigates

 
Frigates of the Royal Netherlands Navy
Frigate classes